Neviot is an Israeli mineral water marketing company.

History 
Neviot was established in 1989 after geologists discovered that the water of Ein Zahav spring near Kiryat Shmona was suitable for drinking. In 2002, Neviot changed its logo and bottle design.

In 2004, the Podhorzer family, which owned Neviot, sold almost half its shares to the Central Bottling Company (Coca-Cola Israel), which already owned 34.06% of Neviot, bringing its  total stake  to 78.58%.

See also
Economy of Israel

References

Drink companies of Israel
Bottled water brands
Israeli drinks
Israeli brands
Mineral water